Lewis George Hilsenteger (born May 6, 1985), known professionally as Unbox Therapy, is a Canadian unboxing and technology YouTube content creator. The channel has 18.2 million subscribers and its videos have received over four billion views.

In September of 2014, Unbox Therapy uploaded a video in which Hilsenteger used only his hands to bend his iPhone 6 Plus. The video is recognized as launching Apple's "Bendgate" controversy in which people could bend their phones in their pockets.

Personal life
Hilsenteger was born on May 6, 1985. He lives in Newmarket, Ontario, in the Greater Toronto Area. Hilsenteger attended the Toronto School of Art where he studied Digital Arts Photography and Video Editing. Hilsenteger owned an Apple repair store close to Ryerson University. He is married and has a son.

YouTube channel
Hilsenteger and Jack McCann created the unboxing YouTube channel Unbox Therapy in December 2010. Hilsenteger decided to create the channel after discovering he enjoyed watching unboxing videos. Unbox Therapy allows viewers to experience the pleasure of opening the newest technological items and not having to spend money on purchasing those items. Two items he unboxed were a breathalyzer that integrated with a smartphone and an "unspillable cup" that he tried to push down. Unbox Therapy uploads several videos per week. The channel's videos routinely get a million views each. The average view of his videos is around 3.7 million as of March 2020. The channel's total number of views has exceeded one billion. Hilsenteger runs another YouTube channel called Lew Later. In May 2019, Unbox Therapy and Lew Later had 19.3 million subscribers combined.

In 2014, Unbox Therapy uploaded a YouTube video titled "iPhone 6 Plus Bend Test" that stoked debate about whether it was likely for people's iPhone 6 Plus to bend in their pockets. In the video, Hilsenteger used only his hands to bend his iPhone 6 Plus. The video in several days was watched tens of millions of times. It became the "fifth highest-trending upload to YouTube". It is Unbox Therapy's most watched video and received 71 million views by August 2019. Although he purchased the phone himself, Hilsenteger was unafraid of demolishing it because he expected to generate sufficient YouTube advertising revenue from the video to buy a new phone. Inverses Catie Keck called the video "a pretty damning illustration of" the bending was "a refresher on how bad this really looked for Apple". Polygons Julia Alexander said Unbox Therapy's video is "largely credited for leading to Apple's 'Bendgate' fiasco with the iPhone 6".

Hilsenteger co-created the YouTube channel with Jack McCann, a videographer who at the channel's beginning was simply known as "Jack" and whose face did not appear in any of the videos. Jack's identity was under much speculation and discussion over several years. Hilsenteger pledged to show who Jack was once the channel reached 10 million subscribers. Unbox Therapy uploaded the face reveal in a YouTube video titled "Jack" in February 2018. Polygons Julia Alexander wrote, "It's a well-executed video that goes over the past and present of Jack's life, finally lending shape to the man who people only knew as Hilsenteger's most trusted friend and the person behind the camera".

In 2018, Unbox Therapy's video titled "The ULTIMATE $30,000 Gaming PC Setup" features a computer setup resembling an airline cockpit, with four monitors, a foot massager, a recliner, expensive headphones, an adjustable weighted mouse, and a SteelSeries keyboard. The Outlines Andrew Paul wrote that the seven-minute video contained "a dizzying flurry of quick cuts" that has become common among "those who create content for the attention-fried". Paul concluded, "Maybe it's the snack crate stocked with Kettle Chips and Christie Collection's Pirate Cookies, or Hilsenteger's shilling of special edition Unbox Therapy  bottles, but on the whole, the thirty-grand rig seems like a little much."

In March 2020, Hilsenteger's integrity was put into question when he left an apparently positive review for the Escobar Fold 2, which was simply a rebadged Galaxy Fold with poorly added Escobar branding. Many customers, when ordering the phones, said that they never received them, with only tech influencers actually receiving products. It has also been alleged that Escobar Inc sent bogus product orders consisting of a book, allowing Escobar Inc to claim the phone had been shipped out. In May 2020, the company released a refurbished version of the iPhone 11 Pro and allegedly sued Apple for $2.6 billion. Escobar Inc is known for its association with Roberto de Jesús Escobar Gaviria, the brother of Pablo Escobar, and various scams. Hilsenteger defended his original video by claiming he had no connection to Escobar Inc, nor that he knew anything about the product he was reviewing prior to his appraisal. The like–dislike ratio on his defence of the original video was split 31:27 as of January 2023. The original video review was made unlisted, although Hilsenteger's true rationale for its deletion are unknown.

References

External links

 
 

Canadian podcasters
Canadian YouTubers
People from Newmarket, Ontario
Technology YouTubers
YouTube channels launched in 2010